The Duke of Mount Deer is a Taiwanese television series adapted from Louis Cha's novel The Deer and the Cauldron. It was first aired on CTV in Taiwan in 1984.

Cast
 Li Hsiao-fei as Wei Xiaobao
 Chou Shao-tung as Kangxi Emperor
 Chen Yu-mei as A'ke
 Chou Ming-hui as Fang Yi
 Ying Hsiao-wei as Mu Jianping
 Lam Sau-kwan as Su Quan
 Pei Hsin-yu as Shuang'er
 Cheng Hsueh-lin as Princess Jianning
 Hsieh Ping-nan as Chen Jinnan
 Yu Wen-hui as Jiunan
 Huang Yong-kuang as Wu Sangui
 Lin Chao-hsiung as Oboi
 Chen Hui-lo as Hai Dafu
 Tang Fu-hsiung as Songgotu
 Kuan Hung as Hong Antong
 Liu Lin as Mao Shiba
 Sung Hsian-hung as Wu Yingxiong
 Chang Han-po as Liu Yizhou
 Wang Hsieh as Liu Dahong
 Wang Chi-sheng as Feng Xifan
 Hu Chin as Empress Dowager
 Hsu Wen-chuan as Prince Kang
 Lin Yao-chung as Zhao Qixian
 Huang Kuan-hsiung as Zhao Liangdong
 Hsieh Wen-to as Wen Youdao
 Sun Shu-pei as Gui Xinshu
 Lin Feng-chin as Gui Erniang
 Pai Yi-che as Gui Zhong

External links

1984 Taiwanese television series debuts
1984 Taiwanese television series endings
Taiwanese wuxia television series
Works based on The Deer and the Cauldron
Television series set in the Qing dynasty
Television shows based on works by Jin Yong